Jane Albert Willens (born June 2, 1946) is an American former tennis player. She is the daughter of San Francisco 49ers quarterback Frankie Albert.

A right-handed player, Albert was a member of the tennis team at Stanford and was the 1964 AIAW singles champion.

While at college she competed on the international tennis tour, including Wimbledon, where she made the quarter-finals in 1965. En route she beat Norma Baylon, Helga Schultze and Françoise Dürr.

Albert represented the United States in the 1966 Wightman Cup, partnering Billie Jean King in doubles.

In 1967, her senior year, she won the AIAW doubles championship with Julie Anthony and competed at the Pan American Games in Winnipeg, winning two gold medals for doubles and a bronze medal in the singles.

Albert's daughter, Heather Willens, played tennis at Stanford and briefly on professional tennis tour in the early 1990s.

References

1946 births
Living people
American female tennis players
Stanford Cardinal women's tennis players
Tennis people from California
Tennis players at the 1967 Pan American Games
Pan American Games medalists in tennis
Pan American Games gold medalists for the United States
Pan American Games bronze medalists for the United States
Medalists at the 1967 Pan American Games